B. P. Moideen (1937–1982) was an Indian politician, film producer, and publisher from Kerala. He was State President of the youth wing of the Praja Socialist Party, and was elected member of Mukkam Panchayat in 1979. Moideen published Sports Herald, a Malayalam sports magazine. His debut production was a Malayalam film Nizhale Nee Sakshi in 1977, which also debuted Seema as a lead actress, and portrayed the Rajan case, but the film was never released. Moideen later produced the films Abhinayam (1981) starring Jayan, and India Nee Sundari.

He was awarded the national civilian gallantry honour Jeevan Raksha Padak, Class I posthumously by the President of India in 1983, for saving lives in a ferry boat accident in Iruvanji River in Kozhikode in 1982, in which he drowned himself.

In popular culture
B. P. Moideen's romance with Kanchanamala was the subject of the 2015 Malayalam biographical film Ennu Ninte Moideen, in which Prithviraj Sukumaran portrayed Moideen.

Memorial
B. P. Moideen Sevamandir, the charity foundation named after Moideen, is led by Moideen's spouse Kanchanamala.

References

1937 births
1982 deaths
Malayalam film producers
Boating accident deaths